Civil law is a major branch of the law. In common law legal systems such as England and Wales and the United States, the term refers to non-criminal law. The law relating to civil wrongs and quasi-contracts is part of the civil law, as is law of property (other than property-related crimes, such as theft or vandalism). Civil law may, like criminal law, be divided into substantive law and procedural law. The rights and duties of persons (natural persons and legal persons) amongst themselves is the primary concern of civil law.

It is often suggested that civil proceedings are taken for the purpose of obtaining compensation for injury, and may thus be distinguished from criminal proceedings, whose purpose is to inflict punishment. However, exemplary damages or punitive damages may be awarded in civil proceedings. It was also formerly possible for common informers to sue for a penalty in civil proceedings.

Because some courts have both a civil and criminal jurisdiction, civil proceedings cannot be defined as those taken in civil courts. In the United States, the expression "civil courts" is used as a shorthand for "trial courts in civil cases".

In England and other common-law countries, the burden of proof in civil proceedings is, in general—with a number of exceptions such as committal proceedings for civil contempt—proof on a balance of probabilities. In civil cases in the law of the Maldives, the burden of proof requires the plaintiff to convince the court of the plaintiff's entitlement to the relief sought. This means that the plaintiff must prove each element of the claim, or cause of action in order to recover.

See also
 Outline of civil law (common law)
 Civil code
 Administrative law
 Federal law
 Federal Rules of Civil Procedure
 Law
 Natural law
 Legal treatise

References

 
Law by type